William Livingston Healy (born January 16, 1985) is an American football coach. He is currently advisor to the head coach and senior offensive analyst for UCF.  He was the head coach at the University of North Carolina at Charlotte in Charlotte, North Carolina from 2019 to 2022. At the time of hire on December 4, 2018, he was the 2nd youngest football coach in Division 1 football. In just his second season at Austin Peay, Healy spearheaded one of the most remarkable turnarounds in college football history.  Coming into the 2017 season with just one win in the last four years, Healy guided the Governors to an 8–4 mark, including an 8–1 record against Football Championship Subdivision competition. Austin Peay tallied seven OVC victories – the most conference wins in program history.

Playing career
Healy, a native of Chattanooga, Tennessee, was an all-state quarterback at Boyd-Buchanan School where he still holds the Chattanooga-area career passing record (7,700+yds). After signing a football scholarship at Air Force coming out of high school, he then transferred to The University of Richmond to play quarterback for Dave Clawson and Mike London. The Spiders went on to win the FCS National Championship in 2008, Healy's senior season, with the game being played in his hometown of Chattanooga, Tennessee. He then started his coaching career for coach Russ Huesman at The University of Tennessee at Chattanooga in 2009.

Coaching career

Early coaching career
After spending his first season at the University of Tennessee at Chattanooga as the quarterbacks coach for record-setting quarterback B. J. Coleman, Healy moved to the wide receivers coaching position. He spent six more years at Chattanooga, with titles of recruiting coordinator and passing game coordinator. As the recruiting coordinator, Healy manufactured back-to-back top recruiting classes in FCS football.

Austin Peay
Healy was announced as the 19th head coach at Austin Peay State University on December 20, 2015. His 2016 recruiting class was ranked top 5 in FCS football, followed by the #1 ranked class in 2017 according to 247sports.

During the 2017 season, a cbssports.com article asserted that "Will Healy is doing a miraculous job at Austin Peay.". Healy's Governors finished the season 8–1 in the FCS with its only FCS loss to Jacksonville State.  The 7–1 mark in the OVC set a school record for Austin Peay and ties the most wins ever in a season.  These accomplishments garnered Healy with the OVC Coach of the Year Award and the Eddie Robinson Award by STATS for the FCS National Coach of the year."

Charlotte 49ers
On December 5, 2018 Healy was announced as the Charlotte 49ers second head football coach. After achieving the program's first winning and bowl season, Healy's contract was altered to extend his terms of service with a slight raise and additional achievement bonuses for himself and his staff.

On August 29, 2019, Healy recorded his first win as the head coach of Charlotte in a 49–28 victory against Gardner–Webb. On September 14th, he recorded his first career victory over a Football Bowl Subdivision (FBS) opponent with a 52–17 win against UMass. Healy would record his first C-USA win against North Texas on October 26th. Healy and the 49ers both would reach bowl eligibility for the first time following a home victory over Marshall on November 23 in his first season at the helm.

On September 3, 2021, Healy would record both his and the program's first win over a Power 5 opponent with a 31 to 28 win over the Duke Blue Devils.

Charlotte fired Healy on October 23, 2022, after a 1–7 start to the season. Offensive line coach Peter Rossomando took over as interim head coach.

UCF
On February 6, 2023, Healy was hired by UCF to be their advisor to the head coach & senior offensive analyst for the 2023 season.

Head coaching record

References

External links
 Charlotte profile

1985 births
Living people
American football quarterbacks
Air Force Falcons football players
Austin Peay Governors football coaches
Charlotte 49ers football coaches
Chattanooga Mocs football coaches
Richmond Spiders football players
UCF Knights football coaches
Sportspeople from Chattanooga, Tennessee
Coaches of American football from Tennessee
Players of American football from Tennessee